Héctor Saúl Osorio Rial (1928–2016) was a pediatrician, bacteriologist, and lichenologist from Uruguay.

Osorio as a youth was keenly interested in natural science. He became a pediatrician and professional bacteriologist, but continued to pursue his avocation of field studies of nature, first in entomology and then in lichenology. He published over 90 scientific articles on the lichens of Uruguay, Argentina, and southern Brazil. At the Museo Nacional de Historia Natural (National Museum of Natural History) in Montevideo, he was assistant director from 1971 to 1985, director from 1985 to 1997, and director emeritus and associate researcher from 1997 to 2016. At Montevideo's Universidad de la Republica, he was a director of the Faculty of Sciences and Humanities and a professor of botany from 1974 to 1985.

Eponyms
 Jenmania osorioi 
 Ochrolechia osorioana  
 Punctelia osorioi 
 Ramalina osorioi

References

Further reading

1928 births
2016 deaths
Uruguayan lichenologists
Uruguayan pediatricians
Academic staff of the University of the Republic (Uruguay)